Bad for Me may refer to:

"Bad for Me" (Meghan Trainor song), 2022
"Bad for Me" (Megan and Liz song), 2012, from the EP Bad for Me
Bad for Me (album), a 1979 album by Dee Dee Bridgewater
"Bad for Me", a 2021 song by Tebey from the album The Good Ones